Bruce Marion Van Sickle (February 13, 1917 – April 21, 2007) was a United States district judge of the United States District Court for the District of North Dakota.

Education and career

Born in Minot, North Dakota, Van Sickle received a Bachelor of Science in Law degree from University of Minnesota in 1939. He received a Juris Doctor from University of Minnesota Law School in 1941. He was a United States Marine Corps Captain from 1941 to 1945. He was an adjudicator for the United States Veterans Administration in Seattle, Washington in 1946. He was a Title Attorney of the Bonneville Power Administration in Portland, Oregon from 1946 to 1947. He was in private practice of law in Minot from 1947 to 1971. He was a Member of the North Dakota House of Representatives from 1957 to 1959.

Federal judicial service

Van Sickle was nominated by President Richard Nixon on December 10, 1971, to a seat on the United States District Court for the District of North Dakota vacated by Judge George Scott Register. He was confirmed by the United States Senate on December 11, 1971, and received his commission on December 15, 1971. He assumed senior status on February 28, 1985, and took inactive senior status on February 1, 2002. His service was terminated on April 21, 2007, due to his death in Bismarck, North Dakota.

Honor

The federal courthouse in Minot was named in his honor in 2002.

References

Sources
 

1917 births
2007 deaths
People from Bismarck, North Dakota
People from Minot, North Dakota
Members of the North Dakota House of Representatives
Judges of the United States District Court for the District of North Dakota
United States district court judges appointed by Richard Nixon
20th-century American judges
University of Minnesota alumni
University of Minnesota Law School alumni
North Dakota lawyers
United States Marine Corps officers
United States Marine Corps personnel of World War II